Robert Jones (born January 28, 1999) is an American football offensive guard for the Miami Dolphins of the National Football League (NFL). He played college football at Middle Tennessee, and was signed by the Dolphins as an undrafted free agent following the 2021 NFL Draft.

Professional career
Following the 2021 NFL Draft, Jones signed with the Miami Dolphins as an undrafted free agent and made the final roster for the season following roster cuts in August. He made his NFL debut in week two of the season.

Jones got his first NFL start at right tackle on January 9, 2021, during the last week of the 2021 NFL season against the New England Patriots.

References

External links
Miami Dolphins bio

Miami Dolphins players
1999 births
Living people
Players of American football from Illinois
Middle Tennessee Blue Raiders football players
Sportspeople from Rockford, Illinois
American football offensive guards